Palythoa heliodiscus, the sunray zoanthid, is a species of cnidarian in the family Sphenopidae.

References

heliodiscus